The voiced retroflex sibilant fricative is a type of consonantal sound, used in some spoken languages. Like all the retroflex consonants, the IPA symbol is formed by adding a rightward-pointing hook extending from the bottom of a z (the letter used for the corresponding alveolar consonant).

Features 

Features of the voiced retroflex sibilant:

Occurrence 
In the following transcriptions, diacritics may be used to distinguish between apical  and laminal .

The commonality of  cross-linguistically is 2% in a phonological analysis of 2155 languages

Voiced retroflex non-sibilant fricative

Features 
Features of the voiced retroflex non-sibilant fricative:

Occurrence

See also
 Index of phonetics articles

Notes

References

External links
 

Fricative consonants
Pulmonic consonants
Voiced oral consonants
Retroflex consonants
Central consonants